Rudolf Engelhard  (born 10 March 1950) is a German politician, representative of the Christian Social Union of Bavaria. Between 1986 and 1996 he was a member of the Landtag of Bavaria.

See also
List of Bavarian Christian Social Union politicians

References

Christian Social Union in Bavaria politicians
1950 births
Living people
Members of the Landtag of Bavaria
Place of birth missing (living people)